Budag Nasirov; born 15 July 1996) is an Azerbaijani football midfielder who plays for Sporting Lisbon.

Career

Club
On 25 July 2016, Nasirov signed a contract with Sporting CP, which can be extended to a five-year term.

Nasirov made his LigaPro debut for Sporting B on 20 August 2016 against Fafe. He scored his first goal for Sporting B in the LigaPro match against Olhanense in a 2–2 home draw on 29 October 2016.

On 10 August 2018, Zira announced the signing of Nasirov on a season-long loan deal.

International
On 26 May 2016 Nasirov made his senior international debut for Azerbaijan in a friendly match against Andorra.

Career statistics

International

Statistics accurate as of match played 26 May 2016

References

External links
 Sporting Lisbon profile
 Portuguese League profile 
 

1996 births
Living people
Sportspeople from Ganja, Azerbaijan
Association football midfielders
Azerbaijani footballers
Azerbaijan youth international footballers
Azerbaijan under-21 international footballers
Azerbaijan international footballers
Azerbaijani expatriate footballers
Expatriate footballers in Portugal
Azerbaijan Premier League players
Liga Portugal 2 players
Turan-Tovuz IK players
Sumgayit FK players
Kapaz PFK players
Zira FK players
Sporting CP B players
Azerbaijani expatriate sportspeople in Portugal